Marianne Werdel (born October 17, 1967) is an American former professional tennis player.

Werdel was born in Los Angeles and played on the WTA Tour from 1982 to 1997. She is also known as Marianne Witmeyer or Werdel-Witmeyer.

She won 19 national junior titles. In 1988 Werdel suffered a partially herniated disc, forcing a two-month absence from the tour.

At the 1995 Australian Open, unseeded Marianne Werdel defeated fifth-seeded Gabriela Sabatini of Argentina in a first-round match. Werdel won the first set, but Sabatini raced out to a 3–0 lead in the second set before twice losing her serve. Werdel won four consecutive games to close out the match in straight sets, dismissing Sabatini 6–4, 6–4. Werdel had also beaten Sabatini two years earlier at a tournament in Japan. After she had disposed of Sabatini, Werdel continued to work her way through the draw beating Park Sung-hee, Elena Makarova, Barbara Paulus and Angélica Gavaldón en route to a semifinal encounter with the top-seed and world No. 1 Arantxa Sánchez Vicario. In their two previous meetings, Werdel had lost both times to Sánchez Vicario. This time proved no different as Sánchez Vicario defeated Werdel in two sets. In reaching the semifinals, the 1995 Australian Open proved to be the best result Werdel would have in Grand Slam singles competition. She defeated Sánchez Vicario two months later in the third round of the Lipton Championships in Key Biscayne.

Werdel was coached by Woody Blocher.

On 21 November 1992, she married Major League Baseball player Ron Witmeyer.

WTA career finals

Singles: 6 runner-ups

Doubles: 6 runner-ups

References

External links

 
 

1967 births
Living people
American female tennis players
Tennis players from Los Angeles
21st-century American women